Deh Now (also Romanized as Deh-i-Nau) is a village in Bid Zard Rural District, in the Central District of Shiraz County, Fars Province, Iran. At the 2006 census, its population was 1,617, in 412 families.

References 

Populated places in Shiraz County